Martin Lawrence Live: Runteldat is a 2002 American stand-up comedy film starring Martin Lawrence, and directed by David Raynr, also responsible for Whatever It Takes. Lawrence also has producing and writing credits for the film. It is Lawrence's second stand-up comedy film after You So Crazy was released in 1994.

Shot on location at the DAR Constitution Hall in Washington D.C., the film was released in August 2002 and went on to gross nearly $20 million at the box office, almost seven times its production cost of $3 million.

After a hiatus due to personal and legal issues, Lawrence makes a return to the stage featuring comedic monologues about the sharp criticism he has received during his struggles and personal reflections about his life as a celebrity. This film was recorded live in his hometown of D.C.

References

External links
Official site

2002 films
Stand-up comedy concert films
Paramount Pictures films
MTV Films films
2000s English-language films
Films directed by David Raynr